Aung San Suu Kyi (born 19 June 1945), sometimes abbreviated to Suu Kyi, is a Burmese politician, diplomat, author, and a 1991 Nobel Peace Prize laureate who served as State Counsellor of Myanmar (equivalent to a prime minister) and Minister of Foreign Affairs from 2016 to 2021. She has served as the chairperson of the National League for Democracy (NLD) since 2011, having been the general secretary from 1988 to 2011. She played a vital role in Myanmar's transition from military junta to partial democracy in the 2010s.

The youngest daughter of Aung San, Father of the Nation of modern-day Myanmar, and Khin Kyi, Aung San Suu Kyi was born in Rangoon, British Burma. After graduating from the University of Delhi in 1964 and 
St Hugh's College, Oxford in 1968, she worked at the United Nations for three years. She married Michael Aris in 1972, with whom she had two children.

Aung San Suu Kyi rose to prominence in the 8888 Uprising of 8 August 1988 and became the General Secretary of the NLD, which she had newly formed with the help of several retired army officials who criticized the military junta. In the 1990 elections, NLD won 81% of the seats in Parliament, but the results were nullified, as the military government (the State Peace and Development Council – SPDC) refused to hand over power, resulting in an international outcry. She had been detained before the elections and remained under house arrest for almost 15 of the 21 years from 1989 to 2010, becoming one of the world's most prominent political prisoners. In 1999, Time magazine named her one of the "Children of Gandhi" and his spiritual heir to nonviolence. She survived an assassination attempt in the 2003 Depayin massacre when at least 70 people associated with the NLD were killed.

Her party boycotted the 2010 elections, resulting in a decisive victory for the military-backed Union Solidarity and Development Party (USDP). Aung San Suu Kyi became a Pyithu Hluttaw MP while her party won 43 of the 45 vacant seats in the 2012 by-elections. In the 2015 elections, her party won a landslide victory, taking 86% of the seats in the Assembly of the Union—well more than the 67% supermajority needed to ensure that its preferred candidates were elected president and second vice president in the presidential electoral college. Although she was prohibited from becoming the president due to a clause in the constitution—her late husband and children are foreign citizens—she assumed the newly created role of State Counsellor of Myanmar, a role akin to a prime minister or a head of government.

When she ascended to the office of state counsellor, Aung San Suu Kyi drew criticism from several countries, organisations and figures over Myanmar's inaction in response to the genocide of the Rohingya people in Rakhine State and refusal to acknowledge that Myanmar's military has committed massacres. Under her leadership, Myanmar also drew criticism for prosecutions of journalists. In 2019, Aung San Suu Kyi appeared in the International Court of Justice where she defended the Burmese military against allegations of genocide against the Rohingya.

Aung San Suu Kyi, whose party had won the November 2020 Myanmar general election, was arrested on 1 February 2021 following a coup d'état that returned the Tatmadaw (Myanmar Armed Forces) to power and sparked protests across the country. Several charges were filed against her, and on 6 December 2021, she was sentenced to four years in prison on two of them. Later, on 10 January 2022, she was sentenced to an additional four years on another set of charges. By 12 October 2022, she had been sentenced to 26 years imprisonment on ten charges in total, including five corruption charges. The United Nations, most European countries, and the United States condemned the arrests, trials, and sentences as politically motivated.

Name 
Aung San Suu Kyi, like other Burmese names, includes no surname, but is only a personal name, in her case derived from three relatives: "Aung San" from her father, "Suu" from her paternal grandmother, and "Kyi" from her mother Khin Kyi.

In Myanmar, Aung San Suu Kyi is often referred to as Daw Aung San Suu Kyi. Daw, literally meaning "aunt", is not part of her name but is an honorific for any older and revered woman, akin to "Madam". She is sometimes addressed as Daw Suu or Amay Suu ("Mother Suu") by her supporters.

Personal life 
Aung San Suu Kyi was born on 19 June 1945 in Rangoon (now Yangon), British Burma. According to Peter Popham, she was born in a small village outside Rangoon called Hmway Saung. Her father, Aung San, allied with the Japanese during World War II. Aung San founded the modern Burmese army and negotiated Burma's independence from the United Kingdom in 1947; he was assassinated by his rivals in the same year. She is a niece of Thakin Than Tun who was the husband of Khin Khin Gyi, the elder sister of her mother Khin Kyi.

She grew up with her mother, Khin Kyi, and two brothers, Aung San Lin and Aung San Oo, in Rangoon. Aung San Lin died at the age of eight when he drowned in an ornamental lake on the grounds of the house. Her elder brother emigrated to San Diego, California, becoming a United States citizen. After Aung San Lin's death, the family moved to a house by Inya Lake where Aung San Suu Kyi met people of various backgrounds, political views, and religions. She was educated in Methodist English High School (now Basic Education High School No. 1 Dagon) for much of her childhood in Burma, where she was noted as having a talent for learning languages. She speaks four languages: Burmese, English, French, and Japanese. She is a Theravada Buddhist.

Aung San Suu Kyi's mother, Khin Kyi, gained prominence as a political figure in the newly formed Burmese government. She was appointed Burmese ambassador to India and Nepal in 1960, and Aung San Suu Kyi followed her there. She studied in the Convent of Jesus and Mary School in New Delhi, and graduated from Lady Shri Ram College, a constituent college of the University of Delhi in New Delhi, with a degree in politics in 1964. Suu Kyi continued her education at St Hugh's College, Oxford, obtaining a B.A. degree in Philosophy, Politics and Economics in 1967, graduating with a third-class degree that was promoted per tradition to an MA in 1968. After graduating, she lived in New York City with family friend Ma Than E, who was once a popular Burmese pop singer. She worked at the United Nations for three years, primarily on budget matters, writing daily to her future husband, Dr. Michael Aris. On 1 January 1972, Aung San Suu Kyi and Aris, a scholar of Tibetan culture and literature, living abroad in Bhutan, were married. The following year, she gave birth to their first son, Alexander Aris, in London; their second son, Kim, was born in 1977. Between 1985 and 1987, Aung San Suu Kyi was working toward a Master of Philosophy degree in Burmese literature as a research student at the School of Oriental and African Studies (SOAS), University of London. She was elected as an Honorary Fellow of St Hugh's in 1990. For two years, she was a Fellow at the Indian Institute of Advanced Studies (IIAS) in Shimla, India. She also worked for the government of the Union of Burma.

In 1988, Aung San Suu Kyi returned to Burma to tend for her ailing mother. Aris' visit in Christmas 1995 was the last time that he and Aung San Suu Kyi met, as she remained in Burma and the Burmese dictatorship denied him any further entry visas. Aris was diagnosed with prostate cancer in 1997 which was later found to be terminal. Despite appeals from prominent figures and organizations, including the United States, UN Secretary-General Kofi Annan and Pope John Paul II, the Burmese government would not grant Aris a visa, saying that they did not have the facilities to care for him, and instead urged Aung San Suu Kyi to leave the country to visit him. She was at that time temporarily free from house arrest but was unwilling to depart, fearing that she would be refused re-entry if she left, as she did not trust the military junta's assurance that she could return.

Aris died on his 53rd birthday on 27 March 1999. Since 1989, when his wife was first placed under house arrest, he had seen her only five times, the last of which was for Christmas in 1995. She was also separated from her children, who live in the United Kingdom, until 2011.

On 2 May 2008, after Cyclone Nargis hit Burma, Aung San Suu Kyi's dilapidated lakeside bungalow lost its roof and electricity, while the cyclone also left entire villages in the Irrawaddy delta submerged. Plans to renovate and repair the house were announced in August 2009. Aung San Suu Kyi was released from house arrest on 13 November 2010.

Political career

Political beginning 
Coincidentally, when Aung San Suu Kyi returned to Burma in 1988, the long-time military leader of Burma and head of the ruling party, General Ne Win, stepped down. Mass demonstrations for democracy followed that event on 8 August 1988 (8–8–88, a day seen as auspicious), which were violently suppressed in what came to be known as the 8888 Uprising. On 26 August 1988, she addressed half a million people at a mass rally in front of the Shwedagon Pagoda in the capital, calling for a democratic government. However, in September 1988, a new military junta took power.

Influenced by both Mahatma Gandhi's philosophy of non-violence and also by the Buddhist concepts, Aung San Suu Kyi entered politics to work for democratization, helped found the National League for Democracy on 27 September 1988, but was put under house arrest on 20 July 1989. She was offered freedom if she left the country, but she refused. Despite her philosophy of non-violence, a group of ex-military commanders and senior politicians who joined NLD during the crisis believed that she was too confrontational and left NLD. However, she retained enormous popularity and support among NLD youths with whom she spent most of her time.

During the crisis, the previous democratically elected Prime Minister of Burma, U Nu, initiated to form an interim government and invited opposition leaders to join him. Indian Prime Minister Rajiv Gandhi had signaled his readiness to recognize the interim government. However, Aung San Suu Kyi categorically rejected U Nu's plan by saying "the future of the opposition would be decided by masses of the people". Ex-Brigadier General Aung Gyi, another influential politician at the time of the 8888 crisis and the first chairman in the history of the NLD, followed the suit and rejected the plan after Aung San Suu Kyi's refusal. Aung Gyi later accused several NLD members of being communists and resigned from the party.

1990 general election and Nobel Peace Prize
In 1990, the military junta called a general election, in which the National League for Democracy (NLD) received 59% of the votes, guaranteeing NLD 80% of the parliament seats. Some claim that Aung San Suu Kyi would have assumed the office of Prime Minister. Instead, the results were nullified and the military refused to hand over power, resulting in an international outcry. Aung San Suu Kyi was placed under house arrest at her home on University Avenue in Rangoon, during which time she was awarded the Sakharov Prize for Freedom of Thought in 1990, and the Nobel Peace Prize one year later. Her sons Alexander and Kim accepted the Nobel Peace Prize on her behalf. Aung San Suu Kyi used the Nobel Peace Prize's US$1.3 million prize money to establish a health and education trust for the Burmese people. Around this time, Aung San Suu Kyi chose non-violence as an expedient political tactic, stating in 2007, "I do not hold to non-violence for moral reasons, but for political and practical reasons."

The decision of the Nobel Committee mentions:

In 1995 Aung San Suu Kyi delivered the keynote address at the Fourth World Conference on Women in Beijing.

1996 attack
On 9 November 1996, the motorcade that Aung San Suu Kyi was traveling in with other National League for Democracy leaders Tin Oo and Kyi Maung, was attacked in Yangon. About 200 men swooped down on the motorcade, wielding metal chains, metal batons, stones and other weapons. The car that Aung San Suu Kyi was in had its rear window smashed, and the car with Tin Oo and Kyi Maung had its rear window and two backdoor windows shattered. It is believed the offenders were members of the Union Solidarity and Development Association (USDA) who were allegedly paid Ks.500/- (@ USD $0.50) each to participate. The NLD lodged an official complaint with the police, and according to reports the government launched an investigation, but no action was taken. (Amnesty International 120297)

House arrest
Aung San Suu Kyi was placed under house arrest for a total of 15 years over a 21-year period, on numerous occasions, since she began her political career, during which time she was prevented from meeting her party supporters and international visitors. In an interview, she said that while under house arrest she spent her time reading philosophy, politics and biographies that her husband had sent her. She also passed the time playing the piano and was occasionally allowed visits from foreign diplomats as well as from her personal physician.

Although under house arrest, Aung San Suu Kyi was granted permission to leave Burma under the condition that she never return, which she refused: "As a mother, the greater sacrifice was giving up my sons, but I was always aware of the fact that others had given up more than me. I never forget that my colleagues who are in prison suffer not only physically, but mentally for their families who have no security outside- in the larger prison of Burma under authoritarian rule."

The media were also prevented from visiting Aung San Suu Kyi, as occurred in 1998 when journalist Maurizio Giuliano, after photographing her, was stopped by customs officials who then confiscated all his films, tapes and some notes. In contrast, Aung San Suu Kyi did have visits from government representatives, such as during her autumn 1994 house arrest when she met the leader of Burma, General Than Shwe and General Khin Nyunt on 20 September in the first meeting since she had been placed in detention. On several occasions during her house arrest, she had periods of poor health and as a result was hospitalized.

The Burmese government detained and kept Aung San Suu Kyi imprisoned because it viewed her as someone "likely to undermine the community peace and stability" of the country, and used both Article 10(a) and 10(b) of the 1975 State Protection Act (granting the government the power to imprison people for up to five years without a trial), and Section 22 of the "Law to Safeguard the State Against the Dangers of Those Desiring to Cause Subversive Acts" as legal tools against her. She continuously appealed her detention, and many nations and figures continued to call for her release and that of 2,100 other political prisoners in the country. On 12 November 2010, days after the junta-backed Union Solidarity and Development Party (USDP) won elections conducted after a gap of 20 years, the junta finally agreed to sign orders allowing Aung San Suu Kyi's release, and her house arrest term came to an end on 13 November 2010.

United Nations involvement
The United Nations (UN) has attempted to facilitate dialogue between the junta and Aung San Suu Kyi. On 6 May 2002, following secret confidence-building negotiations led by the UN, the government released her; a government spokesman said that she was free to move "because we are confident that we can trust each other". Aung San Suu Kyi proclaimed "a new dawn for the country". However, on 30 May 2003 in an incident similar to the 1996 attack on her, a government-sponsored mob attacked her caravan in the northern village of Depayin, murdering and wounding many of her supporters. Aung San Suu Kyi fled the scene with the help of her driver, Kyaw Soe Lin, but was arrested upon reaching Ye-U. The government imprisoned her at Insein Prison in Rangoon. After she underwent a hysterectomy in September 2003, the government again placed her under house arrest in Rangoon.

The results from the UN facilitation have been mixed; Razali Ismail, UN special envoy to Burma, met with Aung San Suu Kyi. Ismail resigned from his post the following year, partly because he was denied re-entry to Burma on several occasions. Several years later in 2006, Ibrahim Gambari, UN Undersecretary-General (USG) of Department of Political Affairs, met with Aung San Suu Kyi, the first visit by a foreign official since 2004. He also met with her later the same year. On 2 October 2007 Gambari returned to talk to her again after seeing Than Shwe and other members of the senior leadership in Naypyidaw. State television broadcast Aung San Suu Kyi with Gambari, stating that they had met twice. This was Aung San Suu Kyi's first appearance in state media in the four years since her current detention began.

The United Nations Working Group for Arbitrary Detention published an Opinion that Aung San Suu Kyi's deprivation of liberty was arbitrary and in contravention of Article 9 of the Universal Declaration of Human Rights 1948, and requested that the authorities in Burma set her free, but the authorities ignored the request at that time. The U.N. report said that according to the Burmese Government's reply, "Daw Aung San Suu Kyi has not been arrested, but has only been taken into protective custody, for her own safety", and while "it could have instituted legal action against her under the country's domestic legislation ... it has preferred to adopt a magnanimous attitude, and is providing her with protection in her own interests".

Such claims were rejected by Brig-General Khin Yi, Chief of Myanmar Police Force (MPF). On 18 January 2007, the state-run paper New Light of Myanmar accused Aung San Suu Kyi of tax evasion for spending her Nobel Prize money outside the country. The accusation followed the defeat of a US-sponsored United Nations Security Council resolution condemning Burma as a threat to international security; the resolution was defeated because of strong opposition from China, which has strong ties with the military junta (China later voted against the resolution, along with Russia and South Africa).

In November 2007, it was reported that Aung San Suu Kyi would meet her political allies National League for Democracy along with a government minister. The ruling junta made the official announcement on state TV and radio just hours after UN special envoy Ibrahim Gambari ended his second visit to Burma. The NLD confirmed that it had received the invitation to hold talks with Aung San Suu Kyi. However, the process delivered few concrete results.

On 3 July 2009, UN Secretary-General Ban Ki-moon went to Burma to pressure the junta into releasing Aung San Suu Kyi and to institute democratic reform. However, on departing from Burma, Ban Ki-moon said he was "disappointed" with the visit after junta leader Than Shwe refused permission for him to visit Aung San Suu Kyi, citing her ongoing trial. Ban said he was "deeply disappointed that they have missed a very important opportunity".

Periods under detention
 20 July 1989: Placed under house arrest in Rangoon under martial law that allows for detention without charge or trial for three years.
 10 July 1995: Released from house arrest.
 23 September 2000: Placed under house arrest.
 6 May 2002: Released after 19 months.
 30 May 2003: Arrested following the Depayin massacre, she was held in secret detention for more than three months before being returned to house arrest.
 25 May 2007: House arrest extended by one year despite a direct appeal from U.N. Secretary-General Kofi Annan to General Than Shwe.
 24 October 2007: Reached 12 years under house arrest, solidarity protests held at 12 cities around the world.
 27 May 2008: House arrest extended for another year, which is illegal under both international law and Burma's own law.
 11 August 2009: House arrest extended for 18 more months because of "violation" arising from the May 2009 trespass incident.
 13 November 2010: Released from house arrest.

2007 anti-government protests

Protests led by Buddhist monks began on 19 August 2007 following steep fuel price increases, and continued each day, despite the threat of a crackdown by the military.

On 22 September 2007, although still under house arrest, Aung San Suu Kyi made a brief public appearance at the gate of her residence in Yangon to accept the blessings of Buddhist monks who were marching in support of human rights. It was reported that she had been moved the following day to Insein Prison (where she had been detained in 2003), but meetings with UN envoy Ibrahim Gambari near her Rangoon home on 30 September and 2 October established that she remained under house arrest.

2009 trespass incident

On 3 May 2009, an American man, identified as John Yettaw, swam across Inya Lake to her house uninvited and was arrested when he made his return trip three days later. He had attempted to make a similar trip two years earlier, but for unknown reasons was turned away. He later claimed at trial that he was motivated by a divine vision requiring him to notify her of an impending terrorist assassination attempt. On 13 May, Aung San Suu Kyi was arrested for violating the terms of her house arrest because the swimmer, who pleaded exhaustion, was allowed to stay in her house for two days before he attempted the swim back. Aung San Suu Kyi was later taken to Insein Prison, where she could have faced up to five years' confinement for the intrusion. The trial of Aung San Suu Kyi and her two maids began on 18 May and a small number of protesters gathered outside. Diplomats and journalists were barred from attending the trial; however, on one occasion, several diplomats from Russia, Thailand and Singapore and journalists were allowed to meet Aung San Suu Kyi. The prosecution had originally planned to call 22 witnesses. It also accused John Yettaw of embarrassing the country. During the ongoing defence case, Aung San Suu Kyi said she was innocent. The defence was allowed to call only one witness (out of four), while the prosecution was permitted to call 14 witnesses. The court rejected two character witnesses, NLD members Tin Oo and Win Tin, and permitted the defence to call only a legal expert. According to one unconfirmed report, the junta was planning to, once again, place her in detention, this time in a military base outside the city. In a separate trial, Yettaw said he swam to Aung San Suu Kyi's house to warn her that her life was "in danger". The national police chief later confirmed that Yettaw was the "main culprit" in the case filed against Aung San Suu Kyi. According to aides, Aung San Suu Kyi spent her 64th birthday in jail sharing biryani rice and chocolate cake with her guards.

Her arrest and subsequent trial received worldwide condemnation by the UN Secretary General Ban Ki-moon, the United Nations Security Council, Western governments, South Africa, Japan and the Association of Southeast Asian Nations, of which Burma is a member. The Burmese government strongly condemned the statement, as it created an "unsound tradition" and criticised Thailand for meddling in its internal affairs. The Burmese Foreign Minister Nyan Win was quoted in the state-run newspaper New Light of Myanmar as saying that the incident "was trumped up to intensify international pressure on Burma by internal and external anti-government elements who do not wish to see the positive changes in those countries' policies toward Burma". Ban responded to an international campaign by flying to Burma to negotiate, but Than Shwe rejected all of his requests.

On 11 August 2009, the trial concluded with Aung San Suu Kyi being sentenced to imprisonment for three years with hard labour. This sentence was commuted by the military rulers to further house arrest of 18 months. On 14 August, US Senator Jim Webb visited Burma, visiting with junta leader Gen. Than Shwe and later with Aung San Suu Kyi. During the visit, Webb negotiated Yettaw's release and deportation from Burma. Following the verdict of the trial, lawyers of Aung San Suu Kyi said they would appeal against the 18-month sentence. On 18 August, United States President Barack Obama asked the country's military leadership to set free all political prisoners, including Aung San Suu Kyi. In her appeal, Aung San Suu Kyi had argued that the conviction was unwarranted. However, her appeal against the August sentence was rejected by a Burmese court on 2 October 2009. Although the court accepted the argument that the 1974 constitution, under which she had been charged, was null and void, it also said the provisions of the 1975 security law, under which she has been kept under house arrest, remained in force. The verdict effectively meant that she would be unable to participate in the elections scheduled to take place in 2010—the first in Burma in two decades. Her lawyer stated that her legal team would pursue a new appeal within 60 days.

Late 2000s: International support for release 

Aung San Suu Kyi has received vocal support from Western nations in Europe, Australia and North and South America, as well as India, Israel, Japan the Philippines and South Korea. In December 2007, the US House of Representatives voted unanimously 400–0 to award Aung San Suu Kyi the Congressional Gold Medal; the Senate concurred on 25 April 2008. On 6 May 2008, President George W. Bush signed legislation awarding Aung San Suu Kyi the Congressional Gold Medal. She is the first recipient in American history to receive the prize while imprisoned. More recently, there has been growing criticism of her detention by Burma's neighbours in the Association of Southeast Asian Nations, particularly from Indonesia, Thailand, the Philippines and Singapore. At one point Malaysia warned Burma that it faced expulsion from ASEAN as a result of the detention of Aung San Suu Kyi. Other nations including South Africa, Bangladesh and the Maldives also called for her release. The United Nations has urged the country to move towards inclusive national reconciliation, the restoration of democracy, and full respect for human rights. In December 2008, the United Nations General Assembly passed a resolution condemning the human rights situation in Burma and calling for Aung San Suu Kyi's release—80 countries voting for the resolution, 25 against and 45 abstentions. Other nations, such as China and Russia, are less critical of the regime and prefer to cooperate only on economic matters. Indonesia has urged China to push Burma for reforms. However, Samak Sundaravej, former Prime Minister of Thailand, criticised the amount of support for Aung San Suu Kyi, saying that "Europe uses Aung San Suu Kyi as a tool. If it's not related to Aung San Suu Kyi, you can have deeper discussions with Myanmar."

Vietnam, however, did not support calls by other ASEAN member states for Myanmar to free Aung San Suu Kyi, state media reported Friday, 14 August 2009. The state-run Việt Nam News said Vietnam had no criticism of Myanmar's decision 11 August 2009 to place Aung San Suu Kyi under house arrest for the next 18 months, effectively barring her from elections scheduled for 2010. "It is our view that the Aung San Suu Kyi trial is an internal affair of Myanmar", Vietnamese government spokesman Le Dung stated on the website of the Ministry of Foreign Affairs. In contrast with other ASEAN member states, Dung said Vietnam has always supported Myanmar and hopes it will continue to implement the "roadmap to democracy" outlined by its government.

Nobel Peace Prize winners (Archbishop Desmond Tutu, the Dalai Lama, Shirin Ebadi, Adolfo Pérez Esquivel, Mairead Corrigan, Rigoberta Menchú, Prof. Elie Wiesel, US President Barack Obama, Betty Williams, Jody Williams and former US President Jimmy Carter) called for the rulers of Burma to release Aung San Suu Kyi to "create the necessary conditions for a genuine dialogue with Daw Aung San Suu Kyi and all concerned parties and ethnic groups to achieve an inclusive national reconciliation with the direct support of the United Nations". Some of the money she received as part of the award helped fund higher education grants to Burmese students through the London-based charity Prospect Burma.

It was announced prior to the 2010 Burmese general election that Aung San Suu Kyi may be released "so she can organize her party", However, Aung San Suu Kyi was not allowed to run. On 1 October 2010 the government announced that she would be released on 13 November 2010.

US President Barack Obama personally advocated the release of all political prisoners, especially Aung San Suu Kyi, during the US-ASEAN Summit of 2009.

The US Government hoped that successful general elections would be an optimistic indicator of the Burmese government's sincerity towards eventual democracy. The Hatoyama government which spent 2.82 billion yen in 2008, has promised more Japanese foreign aid to encourage Burma to release Aung San Suu Kyi in time for the elections; and to continue moving towards democracy and the rule of law.

In a personal letter to Aung San Suu Kyi, UK Prime Minister Gordon Brown cautioned the Burmese government of the potential consequences of rigging elections as "condemning Burma to more years of diplomatic isolation and economic stagnation".

Aung San Suu Kyi met with many heads of state and opened a dialog with the Minister of Labor Aung Kyi (not to be confused with Aung San Suu Kyi). She was allowed to meet with senior members of her NLD party at the State House, however these meetings took place under close supervision.

2010 release

On the evening of 13 November 2010, Aung San Suu Kyi was released from house arrest. This was the date her detention had been set to expire according to a court ruling in August 2009 and came six days after a widely criticised general election. She appeared in front of a crowd of her supporters, who rushed to her house in Rangoon when nearby barricades were removed by the security forces. Aung San Suu Kyi had been detained for 15 of the past 21 years. The government newspaper New Light of Myanmar reported the release positively, saying she had been granted a pardon after serving her sentence "in good conduct". The New York Times suggested that the military government may have released Aung San Suu Kyi because it felt it was in a confident position to control her supporters after the election.
Her son Kim Aris was granted a visa in November 2010 to see his mother shortly after her release, for the first time in 10 years. He visited again on 5 July 2011, to accompany her on a trip to Bagan, her first trip outside Yangon since 2003. Her son visited again on 8 August 2011, to accompany her on a trip to Pegu, her second trip.

Discussions were held between Aung San Suu Kyi and the Burmese government during 2011, which led to a number of official gestures to meet her demands. In October, around a tenth of Burma's political prisoners were freed in an amnesty and trade unions were legalised.

In November 2011, following a meeting of its leaders, the NLD announced its intention to re-register as a political party to contend 48 by-elections necessitated by the promotion of parliamentarians to ministerial rank. Following the decision, Aung San Suu Kyi held a telephone conference with US President Barack Obama, in which it was agreed that Secretary of State Hillary Clinton would make a visit to Burma, a move received with caution by Burma's ally China. On 1 December 2011, Aung San Suu Kyi met with Hillary Clinton at the residence of the top-ranking US diplomat in Yangon.

On 21 December 2011, Thai Prime Minister Yingluck Shinawatra met Aung San Suu Kyi in Yangoon, marking Aung San Suu Kyi's "first-ever meeting with the leader of a foreign country".

On 5 January 2012, British Foreign Minister William Hague met Aung San Suu Kyi and his Burmese counterpart. This represented a significant visit for Aung San Suu Kyi and Burma. Aung San Suu Kyi studied in the UK and maintains many ties there, whilst Britain is Burma's largest bilateral donor.
During Aung San Suu Kyi's visit to Europe, she visited the Swiss parliament, collected her 1991 Nobel Prize in Oslo and her honorary degree from the University of Oxford.

2012 by-elections

In December 2011, there was speculation that Aung San Suu Kyi would run in the 2012 national by-elections to fill vacant seats. On 18 January 2012, Aung San Suu Kyi formally registered to contest a Pyithu Hluttaw (lower house) seat in the Kawhmu Township constituency in special parliamentary elections to be held on 1 April 2012. The seat was previously held by Soe Tint, who vacated it after being appointed Construction Deputy Minister, in the 2010 election. She ran against Union Solidarity and Development Party candidate Soe Min, a retired army physician and native of Twante Township.

On 3 March 2012, at a large campaign rally in Mandalay, Aung San Suu Kyi unexpectedly left after 15 minutes, because of exhaustion and airsickness.

In an official campaign speech broadcast on Burmese state television's MRTV on 14 March 2012, Aung San Suu Kyi publicly campaigned for reform of the 2008 Constitution, removal of restrictive laws, more adequate protections for people's democratic rights, and establishment of an independent judiciary. The speech was leaked online a day before it was broadcast. A paragraph in the speech, focusing on the Tatmadaw's repression by means of law, was censored by authorities.

Aung San Suu Suu Kyi also called for international media to monitor the by-elections, while publicly pointing out irregularities in official voter lists, which include deceased individuals and exclude other eligible voters in the contested constituencies. On 21 March 2012, Aung San Suu Kyi was quoted as saying "Fraud and rule violations are continuing and we can even say they are increasing."

When asked whether she would assume a ministerial post if given the opportunity, she said the following:

On 26 March 2012, Aung San Suu Kyi suspended her nationwide campaign tour early, after a campaign rally in Myeik (Mergui), a coastal town in the south, citing health problems due to exhaustion and hot weather.

On 1 April 2012, the NLD announced that Aung San Suu Kyi had won the vote for a seat in Parliament. A news broadcast on state-run MRTV, reading the announcements of the Union Election Commission, confirmed her victory, as well as her party's victory in 43 of the 45 contested seats, officially making Aung San Suu Kyi the Leader of the Opposition in the Pyidaungsu Hluttaw.

Although she and other MP-elects were expected to take office on 23 April when the Hluttaws resumed session, National League for Democracy MP-elects, including Aung San Suu Kyi, said they might not take their oaths because of its wording; in its present form, parliamentarians must vow to "safeguard" the constitution. In an address on Radio Free Asia, she said "We don't mean we will not attend the parliament, we mean we will attend only after taking the oath ... Changing that wording in the oath is also in conformity with the Constitution. I don't expect there will be any difficulty in doing it."

On 2 May 2012, National League for Democracy MP-elects, including Aung San Suu Kyi, took their oaths and took office, though the wording of the oath was not changed. According to the Los Angeles Times, "Suu Kyi and her colleagues decided they could do more by joining as lawmakers than maintaining their boycott on principle."
On 9 July 2012, she attended the Parliament for the first time as a lawmaker.

2015 general election

On 16 June 2012, Aung San Suu Kyi was finally able to deliver her Nobel acceptance speech (Nobel lecture) at Oslo's City Hall, two decades after being awarded the peace prize. In September 2012, Aung San Suu Kyi received in person the United States Congressional Gold Medal, which is the highest Congressional award. Although she was awarded this medal in 2008, at the time she was under house arrest, and was unable to receive the medal. Aung San Suu Kyi was greeted with bipartisan support at Congress, as part of a coast-to-coast tour in the United States. In addition, Aung San Suu Kyi met President Barack Obama at the White House. The experience was described by Aung San Suu Kyi as "one of the most moving days of my life". In 2014, she was listed as the 61st-most-powerful woman in the world by Forbes.

On 6 July 2012, Aung San Suu Kyi announced on the World Economic Forum's website that she wanted to run for the presidency in Myanmar's 2015 elections. The current Constitution, which came into effect in 2008, bars her from the presidency because she is the widow and mother of foreigners—provisions that appeared to be written specifically to prevent her from being eligible.

The NLD won a sweeping victory in those elections, winning at least 255 seats in the House of Representatives and 135 seats in the House of Nationalities. In addition, Aung San Suu Kyi won re-election to the House of Representatives. Under the 2008 constitution, the NLD needed to win at least a two-thirds majority in both houses to ensure that its candidate would become president. Before the elections, Aung San Suu Kyi announced that even though she is constitutionally barred from the presidency, she would hold the real power in any NLD-led government. On 30 March 2016 she became Minister for the President's Office, for Foreign Affairs, for Education and for Electric Power and Energy in President Htin Kyaw's government; later she relinquished the latter two ministries and President Htin Kyaw appointed her State Counsellor, a position akin to a Prime Minister created especially for her. The position of State Counsellor was approved by the House of Nationalities on 1 April 2016 and the House of Representatives on 5 April 2016. The next day, her role as State Counsellor was established.

State Counsellor and Foreign Minister (2016–2021)

As soon as she became foreign minister, she invited Chinese Foreign Minister Wang Yi, Canadian Foreign Minister Stephane Dion and Italian Foreign Minister Paolo Gentiloni in April and Japanese Foreign Minister Fumio Kishida in May and discussed to have good diplomatic relationships with these countries.

Initially, upon accepting the State Counsellor position, she granted amnesty to the students who were arrested for opposing the National Education Bill, and announced the creation of the commission on Rakhine State, which had a long record of persecution of the Muslim Rohingya minority. However, soon Aung San Suu Kyi's government did not manage with the ethnic conflicts in Shan and Kachin states, where thousands of refugees fled to China, and by 2017 the persecution of the Rohingya by the government forces escalated to the point that it is not uncommonly called a genocide. Aung San Suu Kyi, when interviewed, has denied the allegations of ethnic cleansing. She has also refused to grant citizenship to the Rohingya, instead taking steps to issue ID cards for residency but no guarantees of citizenship.

Her tenure as State Counsellor of Myanmar has drawn international criticism for her failure to address her country's economic and ethnic problems, particularly the plight of the Rohingya following the 25 August 2017 ARSA attacks (described as "certainly one of the biggest refugee crises and cases of ethnic cleansing since the Second World War"), for the weakening of freedom of the press and for her style of leadership, described as imperious and "distracted and out of touch".

During the COVID-19 pandemic in Myanmar, Suu Kyi chaired a National Central Committee responsible for coordinating the country's pandemic response.

Response to violence against Rohingya Muslims and refugees
In 2017, critics called for Aung San Suu Kyi's Nobel prize to be revoked, citing her silence over the persecution of Rohingya people in Myanmar.
Some activists criticised Aung San Suu Kyi for her silence on the 2012 Rakhine State riots (later repeated during the 2015 Rohingya refugee crisis), and her indifference to the plight of the Rohingya, Myanmar's persecuted Muslim minority. In 2012, she told reporters she did not know if the Rohingya could be regarded as Burmese citizens. In a 2013 interview with the BBC's Mishal Husain, Aung San Suu Kyi did not condemn violence against the Rohingya and denied that Muslims in Myanmar have been subject to ethnic cleansing, insisting that the tensions were due to a "climate of fear" caused by "a worldwide perception that global Muslim power is 'very great. She did condemn "hate of any kind" in the interview. According to Peter Popham, in the aftermath of the interview, she expressed anger at being interviewed by a Muslim. Husain had challenged Aung San Suu Kyi that almost all of the impact of violence was against the Rohingya, in response to Aung San Suu Kyi's claim that violence was happening on both sides, and Peter Popham described her position on the issue as one of purposeful ambiguity for political gain.

However, she said that she wanted to work towards reconciliation and she cannot take sides as violence has been committed by both sides. According to The Economist, her "halo has even slipped among foreign human-rights lobbyists, disappointed at her failure to make a clear stand on behalf of the Rohingya minority". However, she has spoken out "against a ban on Rohingya families near the Bangladeshi border having more than two children".

In a 2015 BBC News article, reporter Jonah Fisher suggested that Aung San Suu Kyi's silence over the Rohingya issue is due to a need to obtain support from the majority Bamar ethnicity as she is in "the middle of a general election campaign". In May 2015, the Dalai Lama publicly called upon her to do more to help the Rohingya in Myanmar, claiming that he had previously urged her to address the plight of the Rohingya in private during two separate meetings and that she had resisted his urging. In May 2016, Aung San Suu Kyi asked the newly appointed United States Ambassador to Myanmar, Scot Marciel, not to refer to the Rohingya by that name as they "are not recognized as among the 135 official ethnic groups" in Myanmar. This followed Bamar protests at Marciel's use of the word "Rohingya".

In 2016, Aung San Suu Kyi was accused of failing to protect Myanmar's Rohingya Muslims during the Rohingya genocide. State crime experts from Queen Mary University of London warned that Aung San Suu Kyi is "legitimising genocide" in Myanmar. Despite continued persecution of the Rohingya well into 2017, Aung San Suu Kyi was "not even admitting, let alone trying to stop, the army's well-documented campaign of rape, murder and destruction against Rohingya villages". On 4 September 2017, Yanghee Lee, the UN's special rapporteur on human rights in Myanmar, criticised Aung San Suu Kyi's response to the "really grave" situation in Rakhine, saying: "The de facto leader needs to step in—that is what we would expect from any government, to protect everybody within their own jurisdiction." The BBC reported that "Her comments came as the number of Rohingya fleeing to Bangladesh reached 87,000, according to UN estimates", adding that "her sentiments were echoed by Nobel Peace laureate Malala Yousafzai, who said she was waiting to hear from Ms Suu Kyi—who has not commented on the crisis since it erupted". The next day George Monbiot, writing in The Guardian, called on readers to sign a change.org petition to have the Nobel peace prize revoked, criticising her silence on the matter and asserting "whether out of prejudice or out of fear, she denies to others the freedoms she rightly claimed for herself. Her regime excludes—and in some cases seeks to silence—the very activists who helped to ensure her own rights were recognised." The Nobel Foundation replied that there existed no provision for revoking a Nobel Prize. Archbishop Desmond Tutu, a fellow peace prize holder, also criticised Aung San Suu Kyi's silence: in an open letter published on social media, he said: "If the political price of your ascension to the highest office in Myanmar is your silence, the price is surely too steep ... It is incongruous for a symbol of righteousness to lead such a country." On 13 September it was revealed that Aung San Suu Kyi would not be attending a UN General Assembly debate being held the following week to discuss the humanitarian crisis, with a Myanmar government spokesman stating "perhaps she has more pressing matters to deal with".

In October 2017, Oxford City Council announced that, following a unanimous cross-party vote, the honour of Freedom of the City, granted in 1997 in recognition of her "long struggle for democracy", was to be withdrawn following evidence emerging from the United Nations which meant that she was "no longer worthy of the honour". A few days later, Munsur Ali, a councillor for City of London Corporation, tabled a motion to rescind the Freedom of the City of London: the motion was supported by Catherine McGuinness, chair of the corporation's policy and resources committee, who expressed "distress ... at the situation in Burma and the atrocities committed by the Burmese military". On 13 November 2017, Bob Geldof returned his Freedom of the City of Dublin award in protest over Aung San Suu Kyi also holding the accolade, stating that he does not "wish to be associated in any way with an individual currently engaged in the mass ethnic cleansing of the Rohingya people of north-west Burma". Calling Aung San Suu Kyi a "handmaiden to genocide", Geldof added that he would take pride in his award being restored if it is first stripped from her. The Dublin City Council voted 59–2 (with one abstention) to revoke Aung San Suu Kyi's Freedom of the City award over Myanmar's treatment of the Rohingya people in December 2017, though Lord Mayor of Dublin Mícheál Mac Donncha denied the decision was influenced by protests by Geldof and members of U2. At the same meeting, the Councillors voted 37–7 (with 5 abstentions) to remove Geldof's name from the Roll of Honorary Freemen.

In March 2018, the United States Holocaust Memorial Museum revoked Aung San Suu Kyi's Elie Wiesel Award, awarded in 2012, citing her failure "to condemn and stop the military's brutal campaign" against Rohingya Muslims.

In May 2018, Aung San Suu Kyi was considered complicit in the crimes against Rohingyas in a report by Britain's International Development Committee.

In August 2018, it was revealed that Aung San Suu Kyi would be stripped of her Freedom of Edinburgh award over her refusal to speak out against the crimes committed against the Rohingya. She had received the award in 2005 for promoting peace and democracy in Burma. This will be only the second time that anyone has ever been stripped of the award, after Charles Stewart Parnell lost it in 1890 due to a salacious affair. Also in August, a UN report, while describing the violence as genocide, added that Aung San Suu Kyi did as little as possible to prevent it.

In early October 2018, both the Canadian Senate and its House of Commons voted unanimously to strip Aung San Suu Kyi of her honorary citizenship. This decision was caused by the Government of Canada's determination that the treatment of the Rohingya by Myanmar's government amounts to genocide.

On 11 November 2018, Amnesty International announced it was revoking her Ambassador of Conscience award.
In December 2019, Aung San Suu Kyi appeared in the International Court of Justice at The Hague where she defended the Burmese military against allegations of genocide against the Rohingya. In a speech of over 3,000 words, Aung San Suu Kyi did not use the term "Rohingya" in describing the ethnic group. She stated that the allegations of genocide were "incomplete and misleading", claiming that the situation was actually a Burmese military response to attacks by the Arakan Rohingya Salvation Army. She also questioned how there could be "genocidal intent" when the Burmese government had opened investigations and also encouraged Rohingya to return after being displaced. However, experts have largely criticized the Burmese investigations as insincere, with the military declaring itself innocent and the government preventing a visit from investigators from the United Nations. Many Rohingya have also not returned due to perceiving danger and a lack of rights in Myanmar.

In January 2020, the International Court of Justice decided that there was a "real and imminent risk of irreparable prejudice to the rights" of the Rohingya. The court also took the view that the Burmese government's efforts to remedy the situation "do not appear sufficient" to protect the Rohingya. Therefore, the court ordered the Burmese government to take "all measures within its power" to protect the Rohingya from genocidal actions. The court also instructed the Burmese government to preserve evidence and report back to the court at timely intervals about the situation.

Arrests and prosecution of journalists
In December 2017, two Reuters journalists, Wa Lone and Kyaw Soe Oo, were arrested while investigating the Inn Din massacre of Rohingyas. Suu Kyi publicly commented in June 2018 that the journalists "weren't arrested for covering the Rakhine issue", but because they had broken Myanmar's Official Secrets Act. As the journalists were then on trial for violating the Official Secrets Act, Aung San Suu Kyi's presumption of their guilt was criticized by rights groups for potentially influencing the verdict. American diplomat Bill Richardson said that he had privately discussed the arrest with Suu Kyi, and that Aung San Suu Kyi reacted angrily and labelled the journalists "traitors". A police officer testified that he was ordered by superiors to use entrapment to frame and arrest the journalists; he was later jailed and his family evicted from their home in the police camp. The judge found the journalists guilty in September 2018 and to be jailed for seven years. Aung San Suu Kyi reacted to widespread international criticism of the verdict by stating: "I don't think anyone has bothered to read" the judgement as it had "nothing to do with freedom of expression at all", but the Official Secrets Act. She also challenged critics to "point out where there has been a miscarriage of justice", and told the two Reuters journalists that they could appeal their case to a higher court.

In September 2018, the Office of the United Nations High Commissioner for Human Rights issued a report that since Aung San Suu Kyi's party, the NLD, came to power, the arrests and criminal prosecutions of journalists in Myanmar by the government and military, under laws which are too vague and broad, have "made it impossible for journalists to do their job without fear or favour."

2021 arrest and trial

On 1 February 2021, Aung San Suu Kyi was arrested and deposed by the Myanmar military, along with other leaders of her National League for Democracy (NLD) party, after the Myanmar military declared the November 2020 general election results fraudulent. A 1 February court order authorized her detainment for 15 days, stating that soldiers searching her Naypyidaw villa had uncovered imported communications equipment lacking proper paperwork. Aung San Suu Kyi was transferred to house arrest on the same evening, and on 3 February was formally charged with illegally importing ten or more walkie-talkies. She faces up to three years in prison for the charges. According to The New York Times, the charge "echoed previous accusations of esoteric legal crimes (and) arcane offenses" used by the military against critics and rivals. As of 9 February, Aung San Suu Suu Kyi continues to be held incommunicado, without access to international observers or legal representation of her choice.

US President Joe Biden raised the threat of new sanctions as a result of the Myanmar military coup. In a statement, the UN Secretary-General António Guterres believes "These developments represent a serious blow to democratic reforms in Myanmar." Volkan Bozkir, President of the UN General Assembly, also voiced his concerns, having tweeted "Attempts to undermine democracy and rule of law are unacceptable", and called for the "immediate release" of the detained NLD party leaders.

On 1 April 2021, Aung San Suu Kyi was charged with the fifth offence in relation to violating the official secrets act. According to her lawyer, it is the most serious charge brought against her after the coup and could carry a sentence of up to 14-years in prison if convicted. On 12 April 2021, Aung San Suu Kyi was hit with another charge, this time "under section 25 of the natural disaster management law". According to her lawyer, it is her sixth indictment. She appeared in court via video link and now faces five charges in the capital Naypyidaw and one in Yangon.

On 28 April 2021, the National Unity Government (NUG), in which Aung San Suu Kyi symbolically remains in her position, anticipated that there would be no talks with the junta until all political prisoners, including her, are set free. This move by her supporters come after an ASEAN-supported consensus with the junta leadership in the past days. However, on 8 May 2021, the junta designated NUG as a terrorist organization and warned citizens not to cooperate, or give aid to the parallel government, stripping Aung San Suu Kyi of her symbolic position. On 10 May 2021, her lawyer said she would appear in court in person for the first time since her arrest after the Supreme Court ruled that she could attend in person and meet her lawyers. She had been previously only allowed to do so remotely from her home. On 21 May 2021, a military junta commission was formed to dissolve Aung San Suu Kyi's National League for Democracy (NLD) on grounds of election fraud in the November 2020 election. On 22 May 2021, during his first interview since the coup, junta leader Min Aung Hlaing reported that she was in good health at her home and that she would appear in court in a matter of days. On 23 May 2021, the European Union expressed support for Aung San Suu Kyi's party and condemned the commission aimed at dissolving the party, echoing the NLD's statement released earlier in the week.

On 24 May 2021, Aung San Suu Kyi appeared in person in court for the first time since the coup to face the "incitement to sedition" charge against her. During the 30-minute hearing, she said that she was not fully aware of what was going on outside as she had no access to full information from the outside and refused to respond on the matters. She was also quoted on the possibility of her party forced dissolution as "Our party grew out of the people so it will exist as long as people support it." In her meeting with her lawyers, Aung San Suu Kyi also wished people "good health".

On 2 June 2021, it was reported that the military had moved her (as well as Win Myint) from their homes to an unknown location.
 
On 10 June 2021, Aung San Suu Kyi was charged with corruption, the most serious charge brought against her, which carries a maximum penalty of 15 years' imprisonment. Aung San Suu Kyi's lawyers say the charges are made to keep her out of the public eye.

On 14 June 2021, the trial against Aung San Suu Kyi began. Any conviction would prevent her from running for office again. Aung San Suu Kyi's lawyers attempted to have prosecution testimony against her on the sedition charge disqualified but the motion was denied by the judge.

On 13 September 2021, court proceedings were to resume against her, but it was postponed due to Aung San Suu Kyi presenting "minor health issues" that impeded her from attending the court in person.

On 4 October 2021, Aung San Suu Kyi asked the judge to reduce her times of court appearances because of her fragile health. Aung San Suu Kyi described her health as "strained".

In November, the Myanmar courts deferred the first verdicts in the trial without further explanation or giving dates. In the same month, she was charged with another charge of corruption, related to the purchase and rental of a helicopter, amounting to nearly a dozen of charges that she faces now.

On 6 December 2021, Suu Kyi was sentenced to 4 years in jail. Suu Kyi, who is still facing multiple charges and further sentences, was sentenced on the charge of inciting dissent and violating COVID-19 protocols. Following a partial pardon by the chief of the military government, Aung San Suu Kyi's four-year sentence was reduced to two years' imprisonment.

On 10 January 2022, the military court in Myanmar sentenced Suu Kyi to an additional four years in prison on a number of charges including "importing and owning walkie-talkies" and "breaking coronavirus rules". The trials, which are closed to the public, the media, and any observers, were described as a "courtroom circus of secret proceedings on bogus charges" by the deputy director for Asia of Human Rights Watch.

On 27 April 2022, Aung San Suu Kyi was sentenced to five years in jail on corruption charges.

On 22 June 2022, junta authorities ordered that all further legal proceedings against Suu Kyi will take place in prison venues, instead of a courtroom. The decision was given no explanation. Citing unidentified sources, the BBC reported that Suu Kyi was also moved on 22 June from house arrest, where she had had close companions, to solitary confinement in a specially-built area inside a prison in Nay Pyi Taw. This is the same prison in which Win Myint had similarly been placed in solitary confinement. The military confirmed that Suu Kyi had been moved to prison.

On 15 August 2022, sources following Aung San Suu Kyi's court proceedings said that she was sentenced to further six years' imprisonment after being found guilty on four corruption charges, bringing her overall sentences to 17 years in prison. In September 2022, she was convicted of election fraud and breaching the state's secrets act and sentenced to a total of six years in prison for both convictions, increasing her overall sentence to 23 years in prison. On 12 October 2022, she was convicted of two further charges of corruption and she was sentenced to two terms of three years' imprisonment to be served concurrent to each other. On 30 December 2022, her trials ended with another conviction and an additional sentence of seven years' imprisonment for corruption. Aung San Suu Kyi's final sentence is of 33 years in prison.

Political beliefs

Asked what democratic models Myanmar could look to, she said: "We have many, many lessons to learn from various places, not just the Asian countries like South Korea, Taiwan, Mongolia, and Indonesia." She also cited "eastern Europe and countries, which made the transition from communist autocracy to democracy in the 1980s and 1990s, and the Latin American countries, which made the transition from military governments. And we cannot of course forget South Africa, because although it wasn't a military regime, it was certainly an authoritarian regime." She added: "We wish to learn from everybody who has achieved a transition to democracy, and also ... our great strong point is that, because we are so far behind everybody else, we can also learn which mistakes we should avoid."

In a nod to the deep US political divide between Republicans led by Mitt Romney and the Democrats by Obama—then battling to win the 2012 presidential election—she stressed, "Those of you who are familiar with American politics I'm sure understand the need for negotiated compromise."

Related organisations

 Freedom Now, a Washington, D.C.-based non-profit organisation, was retained in 2006 by a member of her family to help secure Aung San Suu Kyi's release from house arrest. The organisation secured several opinions from the UN Working Group on Arbitrary Detention that her detention was in violation of international law; engaged in political advocacy such as spearheading a letter from 112 former Presidents and Prime Ministers to UN Secretary-General Ban Ki-moon urging him to go to Burma to seek her release, which he did six weeks later; and published numerous op-eds and spoke widely to the media about her ongoing detention. Its representation of her ended when she was released from house arrest on 13 November 2010.
 Aung San Suu Kyi has been an honorary board member of International IDEA and ARTICLE 19 since her detention, and has received support from these organisations.
 The Vrije Universiteit Brussel and the University of Louvain (UCLouvain), both located in Belgium, granted her the title of Doctor Honoris Causa.
 In 2003, the Freedom Forum recognised Aung San Suu Kyi's efforts to promote democracy peacefully with the Al Neuharth Free Spirit of the Year Award, in which she was presented over satellite because she was under house arrest. She was awarded one million dollars.
 In June of each year, the U.S. Campaign for Burma organises hundreds of "Arrest Yourself" house parties around the world in support of Aung San Suu Kyi. At these parties, the organisers keep themselves under house arrest for 24 hours, invite their friends, and learn more about Burma and Aung San Suu Kyi.
 The Freedom Campaign, a joint effort between the Human Rights Action Center and US Campaign for Burma, looks to raise worldwide attention to the struggles of Aung San Suu Kyi and the people of Burma.
 The Burma Campaign UK is a UK-based NGO (Non-Governmental Organisation) that aims to raise awareness of Burma's struggles and follow the guidelines established by the NLD and Aung San Suu Kyi.
 St Hugh's College, Oxford, where she studied, had a Burmese theme for their annual ball in support of her in 2006. The university later awarded her an honorary doctorate in civil law on 20 June 2012 during her visitation on her alma mater.
 Aung San Suu Kyi is the official patron of The Rafto Human Rights House in Bergen, Norway. She received the Thorolf Rafto Memorial Prize in 1990.
 She was made an honorary free person of the City of Dublin, Ireland in November 1999, although a space had been left on the roll of signatures to symbolize her continued detention. This was subsequently revoked on 13 December 2017.
 In November 2005 the human rights group Equality Now proposed Aung Sun Suu Kyi as a potential candidate, among other qualifying women, for the position of U.N. Secretary General. In the proposed list of qualified women Aung San Suu Kyi is recognised by Equality Now as the Prime Minister-Elect of Burma.
 The UN' special envoy to Myanmar, Ibrahim Gambari, met Aung San Suu Kyi on 10 March 2008 before wrapping up his trip to the military-ruled country.
 Aung San Suu Kyi was an honorary member of The Elders, a group of eminent global leaders brought together by Nelson Mandela. Her ongoing detention meant that she was unable to take an active role in the group, so The Elders placed an empty chair for her at their meetings. The Elders have consistently called for the release of all political prisoners in Burma. Upon her election to parliament, she stepped down from her post.
 In 2010, Aung San Suu Kyi was given an honorary doctorate from the University of Johannesburg.
 In 2011, Aung San Suu Kyi was named the Guest Director of the 45th Brighton Festival.
 She was part of the international jury of Human Rights Defenders and Personalities who helped to choose a universal Logo for Human Rights in 2011.
 In June 2011, the BBC announced that Aung San Suu Kyi was to deliver the 2011 Reith Lectures. The BBC covertly recorded two lectures with Aung San Suu Kyi in Burma, which were then smuggled out of the country and brought back to London. The lectures were broadcast on BBC Radio 4 and the BBC World Service on 28 June 2011 and 5 July 2011.
 8 March 2012, Canadian Foreign Affairs Minister John Baird presented Aung San Suu Kyi a certificate of honorary Canadian citizenship and an informal invitation to visit Canada. The honorary citizenship was revoked in September 2018 due to the Rohingya conflict.
 In April 2012, British Prime Minister David Cameron became the first leader of a major world power to visit Aung San Suu Kyi and the first British prime minister to visit Burma since the 1950s. In his visit, Cameron invited Aung San Suu Kyi to Britain where she would be able to visit her 'beloved' Oxford, an invitation which she later accepted. She visited Britain on 19 June 2012.
 In 2012 she received the Honorary degree of Doctor of Civil Law from the University of Oxford.
 In May 2012, Aung San Suu Kyi received the inaugural Václav Havel Prize for Creative Dissent of the Human Rights Foundation.
 29 May 2012 PM Manmohan Singh of India visited Aung San Suu Kyi. In his visit, PM invited Aung San Suu Kyi to India as well. She started her six-day visit to India on 16 November 2012, where among the places she visited was her alma mater Lady Shri Ram College in New Delhi.
In 2012, Aung San Suu Kyi set up the charity Daw Khin Kyi Foundation to improve health, education and living standards in underdeveloped parts of Myanmar. The charity was named after Aung San Suu Kyi's mother. Htin Kyaw played a leadership role in the charity before his election as President of Myanmar. The charity runs a Hospitality and Catering Training Academy in Kawhmu Township, in Yangon Region, and runs a mobile library service which in 2014 had 8000 members.
 Seoul National University in South Korea conferred an honorary doctorate degree to Aung San Suu Kyi in February 2013.
 University of Bologna, Italy conferred an honorary doctorate degree in philosophy to Aung San Suu Kyi in October 2013.
 Monash University, The Australian National University, University of Sydney and University of Technology, Sydney conferred an honorary degree to Aung San Suu Kyi in November 2013.

In popular culture

The life of Aung San Suu Kyi and her husband Michael Aris is portrayed in Luc Besson's 2011 film The Lady, in which they are played by Michelle Yeoh and David Thewlis. Yeoh visited Aung San Suu Kyi in 2011 before the film's release in November. In the John Boorman's 1995 film Beyond Rangoon, Aung San Suu Kyi was played by Adelle Lutz.

Irish songwriters Damien Rice and Lisa Hannigan released in 2005 the single "Unplayed Piano", in support of the Free Aung San Suu Kyi 60th Birthday Campaign that was happening at the time. U2's Bono wrote the song "Walk On" in tribute to Aung San Suu Kyi (and wore a shirt with her name and image upon it), and he publicized her plight during the U2 360° Tour, 2009–2011. Saxophonist Wayne Shorter composed a song titled "Aung San Suu Kyi". It appears on his albums 1+1 (with pianist Herbie Hancock) and Footprints Live!.

Health problems
Aung San Suu Kyi underwent surgery for a gynecological condition in September 2003 at Asia Royal Hospital during her house arrest. She also underwent minor foot surgery in December 2013 and eye surgery in April 2016. In June 2012, her doctor Tin Myo Win said that she had no serious health problems, but weighed only , had low blood pressure, and could become weak easily.

Books
 Freedom from Fear (1991)
 Letters from Burma (1991)
 Let's Visit Nepal (1985) (ISBN 978-0222009814)

Honours
 List of honours of Aung San Suu Kyi

See also

 List of civil rights leaders
 List of Nobel laureates affiliated with Kyoto University
 State Counsellor of Myanmar 
 List of foreign ministers in 2017
 List of current foreign ministers

Notes

References

Bibliography

 Miller, J. E. (2001). Who's Who in Contemporary Women's Writing. Routledge.
 Reid, R., Grosberg, M. (2005). Myanmar (Burma). Lonely Planet. .
 Stewart, Whitney (1997). Aung San Suu Kyi: Fearless Voice of Burma. Twenty-First Century Books. .

Further reading
 Combs, Daniel. Until the World Shatters: Truth, Lies, and the Looting of Myanmar (2021).
 
 Aung San Suu Kyi (Modern Peacemakers) (2007) by Judy L. Hasday, 
 The Lady: Aung San Suu Kyi: Nobel Laureate and Burma's Prisoner (2002) by Barbara Victor, or 1998 hardcover: 
 The Lady and the Peacock: The Life of Aung San Suu Kyi (2012) by Peter Popham, 
 Perfect Hostage: A Life of Aung San Suu Kyi (2007) by Justin Wintle, 
 Tyrants: The World's 20 Worst Living Dictators (2006) by David Wallechinsky, 
 Aung San Suu Kyi (Trailblazers of the Modern World) (2004) by William Thomas, 
 No Logo: No Space, No Choice, No Jobs (2002) by Naomi Klein 
 Mental culture in Burmese crisis politics: Aung San Suu Kyi and the National League for Democracy (ILCAA Study of Languages and Cultures of Asia and Africa Monograph Series) (1999) by Gustaaf Houtman, 
 Aung San Suu Kyi: Standing Up for Democracy in Burma (Women Changing the World) (1998) by Bettina Ling 
 Prisoner for Peace: Aung San Suu Kyi and Burma's Struggle for Democracy (Champions of Freedom Series) (1994) by John Parenteau, 
 Des femmes prix Nobel de Marie Curie à Aung San Suu Kyi, 1903–1991 (1992) by Charlotte Kerner, Nicole Casanova, Gidske Anderson, 
 Aung San Suu Kyi, towards a new freedom (1998) by Chin Geok Ang 
 Aung San Suu Kyi's struggle: Its principles and strategy (1997) by Mikio Oishi 
 Finding George Orwell in Burma (2004) by Emma Larkin 
 Character Is Destiny: Inspiring Stories Every Young Person Should Know and Every Adult Should Remember (2005) by John McCain, Mark Salter. Random House 
 
 Under the Dragon: A Journey Through Burma (1998/2010) by Rory MacLean

External links

 Aung San Suu Kyi's website (Site appears to be inactive. Last posting was in July 2014)
 
 
 
 
 

|-

|-

|-

|-

|-

|-

|-

|-

|-

|-

|-

|-

|-

 
1945 births
21st-century Burmese women politicians
21st-century Burmese politicians
Alumni of SOAS University of London
Alumni of St Hugh's College, Oxford
Amnesty International prisoners of conscience held by Myanmar
Buddhist pacifists
Burmese activists
Burmese democracy activists
Burmese human rights activists
Burmese Nobel laureates
Burmese pacifists
Burmese prisoners and detainees
Burmese revolutionaries
Burmese socialists
Burmese Theravada Buddhists
Burmese women activists
Burmese women in politics
Children of national leaders
Civil rights activists
Women civil rights activists
Congressional Gold Medal recipients
Fellows of St Hugh's College, Oxford
Fellows of the Royal College of Surgeons of Edinburgh
Foreign ministers of Myanmar
Female foreign ministers
Women government ministers of Myanmar
Female heads of government
Gandhians
Honorary Companions of the Order of Australia
Lady Shri Ram College alumni
Leaders ousted by a coup
Living people
Members of Pyithu Hluttaw
National League for Democracy politicians
Nobel Peace Prize laureates
Nonviolence advocates
Olof Palme Prize laureates
People from Yangon
Presidential Medal of Freedom recipients
People stripped of honorary degrees
Women Nobel laureates
Women opposition leaders
Burmese women diplomats
20th-century Burmese women writers
21st-century Burmese women writers
20th-century Burmese writers
21st-century Burmese writers
Recipients of the Four Freedoms Award
Heads of government who were later imprisoned
Prisoners and detainees of Myanmar
Sakharov Prize laureates
Political prisoners
International Simón Bolívar Prize recipients
Family of Aung San